The 2018 Australian Formula 3 Premier Series was an Australian open-wheel racing series for FIA Formula 3 cars constructed and conforming to the regulations before and including 2011. The series began on 10 March 2018 at Winton Motor Raceway and concluded on 21 October 2018 at The Bend Motorsport Park. Organised by Formula Three Management Pty Ltd, it was the third running of the Australian Formula 3 Premier Series.

The series was won by Harri Jones driving a Dallara F311 Mercedes-Benz.

Teams and drivers
The following teams and drivers contested the 2018 Australian Formula 3 Premier Series. All teams and drivers were Australian-registered.

Classes
Competing cars were nominated into one of three classes:
 Premier Class – for automobiles constructed in accordance with the FIA Formula 3 regulations that applied in the year of manufacture between 1 January 2005 and 31 December 2011.
 National Class – for automobiles constructed in accordance with the FIA Formula 3 regulations that applied in the year of manufacture between 1 January 2002 and 31 December 2007.
 Trophy Class.

Calendar & race results
The series was contested over six rounds. All rounds were held in Australia.

Championship standings 

 Points system
Points for are awarded as follows:

Drivers' championship

References

Australian Formula 3 seasons
Formula 3
Australian
Australian F3